Joseph Thomas "Brute" Bretto (November 28, 1912 – January 27, 2007) was an American professional ice hockey defenseman who played three games in the National Hockey League with the Chicago Black Hawks. Bretto spent most of his career with the St. Paul Saints of the American Hockey Association.

External links

1912 births
2007 deaths
American men's ice hockey defensemen
Chicago Blackhawks players
Ice hockey players from Minnesota
Sportspeople from Hibbing, Minnesota